The Battlefield Tour was a concert tour by American pop singer Jordin Sparks in support of her second studio album Battlefield. It is Sparks' first headlining tour. The tour consisted of mostly general assembly venues such as theaters, ballrooms, amusement parks, and casinos. It was initially only set to visit 15 cities nationwide. On April 22, several dates were rescheduled in order to expand the tour to 39 cities across the nation. The tour started on May 1, 2010, in Uncasville, Connecticut and ended on July 18, 2010, in Philadelphia, Pennsylvania. In an interview with AI Now, Sparks spoke of the tour "Hopefully, maybe in March I will be doing a tour. I would love to do a House of Blues theater type tour so it’s a little more intimate...it’s really fulfilling after you get off a stage like that, it’s really awesome because it’s like you can say 'hey, I left everything out there.'"

Supporting acts
 Kate Voegele was the opening act on selected tour dates until June 25, 2010.
 Days Difference, a pop rock band, were also an opening act on selected dates of the tour.
 Ashlyne Huff replaced Kate Voegele as the opening act on June 26, 2010.
 Sid Curtis replaced Ashlyne Huff for one night, on July 10, 2010.

Guest appearances 
 Australian artist, Guy Sebastian made a guest appearance at three of Sparks' concerts in San Diego, Los Angeles and San Francisco from July 8 to July 10, 2010, performing their single "Art of Love" together

Set list

"Battlefield"
"S.O.S. (Let the Music Play)"
"Watch You Go"
"Emergency (911)"
"It Takes More"
"Don't Let it Go to Your Head"
"One Step at a Time"
"Walking on Snow"
"Freeze"
"No Parade"
"Young and in Love"
"Tattoo"
Encore
"No Air"

Band members
Lead vocals: Jordin Sparks
Keyboard: Scotty Granger
Lead Guitar: JinJoo Lee
Bass: Jesse Stern
Drums: Micheal Bedard
Backup Vocals: Brandon Winbush, Devin Micheal and Sharon Youngblood

Tour dates

Cancellations

Notes

References

External links
 Official Jordin Sparks website
Official website of tour

2010 concert tours
Concert tours of the United States
Jordin Sparks